= Merritt T. Cooke =

American politician

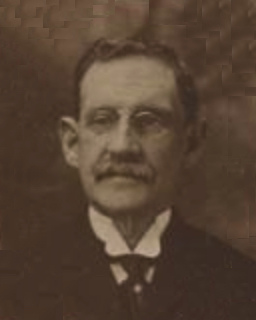

Member of the Virginia House of Delegates from Norfolk City
- In office January 8, 1908 – January 10, 1912
- Preceded by: E. W. Gaines
- Succeeded by: Benjamin A. Banks
- In office December 2, 1891 – December 6, 1899
- Preceded by: John T. Lawler
- Succeeded by: John Whitehead

Personal details
- Born: Merritt Todd Cooke; October 17, 1846 Norfolk, Virginia, U.S.
- Died: July 12, 1922 (aged 75) Norfolk, Virginia, U.S.
- Party: Democratic
- Spouse: Mary Elizabeth Dickson (m. 1879)

Military service
- Allegiance: Confederate States
- Branch/service: Confederate States Army
- Years of service: 1861–1865
- Battles/wars: American Civil War

Merritt Todd Cooke (October 17, 1846 – July 12, 1922) was an American politician. A native of Norfolk, he represented the city in the Virginia House of Delegates.
